is a Japanese actress and singer. She is nicknamed "Good-P" short for Good Personality. She has had prominent roles in a number of television series, feature films and stage productions. As a singer she has released ten albums.

She has been represented with several agencies, including Big Apple, Hirata Office, Toho Entertainment, and Konni.

Discography
Those not listed in the publisher is released from Victor Entertainment (formerly Victor music industry).

Singles

Albums
Original albums

Best albums

Omnibus

Musical Recordings

Other already released song recording board

Soundtracks

Mashin Hero Wataru series

Haō Taikei Ryū Knight series

Compilations

LD/VHS

(LD and VHS versions exist for all of the above works, and the DVD version was released on 19 November 2008)

Bibliography

Essays

Photo albums

Filmography

TV dramas

Films, direct-to-video

Stage

Concerts, live

Solo tours

Single solo

Events

Live guest appearances

Single events

Radio

Variety

TV programmes

Advertisements

Others

People who share the same name
1949 born Hotokekunitera chief priest (now, Yakushi hermitage Myoen). Wrote many health-related books. Natural Buddhist temple
Actress and model born on 1989. Yumiko Takahashi official blog
Vocalist of the musical unit Akane. Akane official website
Yumiko Takahashi who is singing on the CD of Genso Water Margin series.

References

Notes

Sources

External links
 – Connie 
 – Gekidan Hobo homepage 
 – Cartoon Network official 
 – Personal blog (Leave update after statement as of the end of June 2011) 

Japanese musical theatre actresses
Japanese idols
Japanese women singers
People from Saitama (city)
1974 births
Living people